Christopher Street is a street in Manhattan, New York.

Christopher Street may also refer to the following subway stations in Manhattan:
Christopher Street – Sheridan Square (IRT Broadway – Seventh Avenue Line), a New York City subway station served by the 
Christopher Street (IRT Ninth Avenue Line), a former elevated station
Christopher Street (PATH station), a PATH subway station

Christopher Street may also refer to:
Christopher Street (magazine)
Chris Street, basketball player

Other things related to Christopher Street include:
 Christopher Street Pier
 Christopher Street Day
 The Christopher Street Connection